Euphorbia origanoides, also called Ascension spurge, is a species of plant in the family Euphorbiaceae. It is endemic to Ascension Island a dependency of the UK overseas territory of Saint Helena.  Its natural habitats are introduced vegetation. It is threatened by habitat loss.

References

Flora of Ascension Island
origanoides
Critically endangered plants
Plants described in 1753
Taxa named by Carl Linnaeus
Taxonomy articles created by Polbot